Viswanathan is a male given name in South India and Sri Lanka. Due to the South Indian tradition of using patronymic surnames it may also be a surname for males and females. It is of Hindu origin and derives from višvanatha, meaning "lord of the universe" (from višva, "universe" + natha, "lord," an epithet of the god Shiva), + the Tamil-Malayalam third-person masculine singular suffix -n.

Notable people
A. K. Viswanathan, Indian police officer
Ashoke Viswanathan (born 1959), Indian film maker
Balasubramanian Viswanathan (born 1941), Indian material scientist
C. N. Visvanathan (born 1947), Indian politician
G. Viswanathan (born 1938), founder and chancellor of VIT University in India
Geraldine Viswanathan (born 1995), Australian actress
Harish Viswanathan, American engineer
Indira Viswanathan Peterson, Indian literary critic
Janaki Vishwanathan, Indian film maker
K. A. P. Viswanatham (1899–1994), Indian scholar
K. K. Viswanathan (1914-1992), Indian politician
K. R. Viswanathan, Indian politician
Kaavya Viswanathan (born 1987), Indian-American Harvard undergraduate student, noted for plagiarism in her 2006 novel
Kaithapram Vishwanathan Namboothiri, Indian musician
Kanithi Viswanatham (born 1932), Indian politician
Kasi Viswanathan (born 1968), Indian film editor
M. S. Viswanathan (1928-2015), Tamil film music composer
Mahesh Viswanathan, American engineer
Mavila Vishwanathan Nair (born 1952), Indian banker
Mitraniketan Viswanathan (1928–2014), Indian social reformer
Mohanlal Viswanathan Nair (born 1960), Indian actor
N. Viswanathan (1929–2010), Indian actor
N. K. Viswanathan (1941–2017), Indian film director
N. S. Vishwanathan (born 1958), Indian banker
Nikil Viswanathan (born 1987), American entrepreneur
P. Viswanathan, Indian politician
Padma Viswanathan (born 1968), Canadian playwright
Paris Viswanathan (born 1940), Indian painter and film maker
Poornam Viswanathan (1921–2008), Indian actor
R. Viswanathan (born 1949), Indian politician
Radha Viswanathan (1934–2018), Indian vocalist
Ramakrishnan Vishwanathan (1960–1999), Indian soldier
Raman Viswanathan (1899–1982), Indian physician
Shiv Visvanathan, Indian academic
Susan Visvanathan (born 1957), Indian sociologist
T. Viswanathan (1927–2002), South Indian classical Carnatic flutist
T. K. Viswanathan (born 1948), Indian administrator
T. R. Viswanathan, American engineer
V. Viswanathan (1909–1987), Indian politician
Viswanathan Anand (born 1969), World Chess Champion 2007-2013
Visvanathan Dharmalingam (1918–1985), Sri Lankan politician
Viswanathan Kumaran (born 1966), Indian chemical engineer
Viswanathan Manikan (born 1951), Indian community activist
Viswanathan Raghunathan (born 1954), Indian academic
Viswanathan Ratnam (born 1932), Indian judge
Viswanathan Ravichandran, Indian film producer
Visvanathan Rudrakumaran, Prime Minister of the Transnational Government of Tamil Eelam
Viswanathan Shanta (1927–2021), Indian oncologist

Other uses
A. R. C. Viswanathan College, arts and science college in Mayiladuthurai, Tamil Nadu, India
Justice Viswanathan, 1971 Indian Tamil language film
K.A.P. Viswanatham Government Medical College, medical college in Tiruchirappalli, Tamil Nadu, India
Viswanatham, town in Tamil Nadu, India
Viswanathan Ramamoorthy, 2001 Indian Tamil film
Viswanathan Velai Venum, a 1985 Indian Tamil film

See also
 
 
 
 
 

Indian surnames
Indian given names
Tamil masculine given names